The Tinian monarch (Monarcha takatsukasae) is a species of bird in the family Monarchidae.
It is endemic to the Northern Mariana Islands.

Taxonomy and systematics 
Some authorities consider the Tinian monarch to belong to the genus Metabolus. Alternate names include Tinian flycatcher and Tinian Island monarch.

Distribution and habitat
The Tinian monarch was formerly endemic to Tinian until introduced to Guguan, Northern Mariana Islands in 2015 and 2016 where it has now bred successfully. The natural habitats of the Tinian monarch are subtropical or tropical moist lowland forest and subtropical or tropical moist shrubland.

Status
The Tinian monarch is threatened by habitat loss and is assessed as near threatened by the IUCN. It has been delisted as endangered by the United States Fish and Wildlife Service, see the Draft Post-Delisting Monitoring Plan.  The current population of Tinian monarchs is estimated to be over 38,000 individuals.

References

External links
BirdLife Species Fatcsheet.

Tinian monarch
Birds of the Northern Mariana Islands
Tinian
Tinian monarch
Taxonomy articles created by Polbot
Taxobox binomials not recognized by IUCN